The Reidsville Luckies were a minor league baseball team based in Reidsville, North Carolina, USA.  They played in the Bi-State League from 1935–1940 and returned in 1947 as part of the Tri-State League in 1947. They switched to the Carolina League in 1948 and remained there till the team was dissolved after the 1955 season.

The team was started back as a College summer team in 2021, and they joined the Old North State League.

Notable alumni

 Watty Clark (1939)

 Dick Culler (1938-1939)

 Dallas Green (1955) Manager: 1980 World Series Champion Philadelphia Phillies

Year Record

Notable alumni

 Watty Clark (1939)

 Dallas Green (1955) Manager: 1980 World Series Champion - Philadelphia Phillies

External links
Baseball Reference

Baseball teams established in 1935
Defunct minor league baseball teams
Brooklyn Dodgers minor league affiliates
Professional baseball teams in North Carolina
Sports clubs disestablished in 1955
1935 establishments in North Carolina
1955 disestablishments in North Carolina
Rockingham County, North Carolina
Defunct baseball teams in North Carolina
Defunct Tri-State League teams
Bi-State League teams
Baseball teams disestablished in 1955